Events from the year 1807 in Russia

Incumbents
 Monarch – Alexander I

Events

 
 
  
  
 Battle of Arpachai
 Lovers of the Russian Word
 Treaties of Tilsit
 Kalashnikov Concern

Births

Vladimir Pecherin

Deaths

References

1807 in Russia
Years of the 19th century in the Russian Empire